Quiroga may refer to:

Places
 Quiroga, Bogotá, a neighborhood of Bogotá, Colombia
 Quiroga (TransMilenio), a bus station
 Quiroga, Michoacán, Mexico
 Quiroga (comarca), Lugo province, Galicia, Spain
 Quiroga, Galicia, a municipality in Lugo province, Galicia, Spain
 Quiroga Ridge, Antarctica

People
 Quiroga (surname)